The Gemini Award for Best Ensemble Performance in a Comedy Program or Series is a defunct award category, presented by the Academy of Canadian Cinema and Television from 2001 to 2011 as part of its Gemini Awards program to honour ensemble performance in comedy programs. Winners and nominees were typically either sketch comedy shows, or the collective cast of a scripted narrative comedy series.

When the Gemini Awards were first introduced in 1986, awards were presented for Best Actor in a Comedy Series and Best Actress in a Comedy Series. However, as Canadian television comedy was dominated in that era primarily by sketch comedy, comedy-drama or stand-up performance shows, rather than traditional sitcoms, comedy performance categories were discontinued after the 2nd Gemini Awards in 1987; for the next few years, performances in comedy-drama shows were eligible to be nominated in the drama performance categories, while sketch comedy performers could be nominated for Best Performance in a Variety or Performing Arts Program or Series.

Beginning with the 6th Gemini Awards in 1992, the Academy introduced a single award for Best Performance in a Comedy Program or Series, whose winners or nominees could be either an individual or an ensemble; separate awards for Best Individual Performance and Best Ensemble Performance were then introduced for the 16th Gemini Awards in 2001.

After 2010, the Individual Performance category was discontinued; separate categories for Best Actor in a Comedy Series and Best Actress in a Comedy Series were reintroduced, alongside new categories for Best Supporting Actor in a Comedy Series and Best Supporting Actress in a Comedy Series, as of the 26th Gemini Awards in 2011. The ensemble category was still presented in 2011, but was discontinued when the Gemini Awards transitioned into the Canadian Screen Awards the following year; with the 4th Canadian Screen Awards in 2016, a new category was reintroduced for Individual or Ensemble Performance in a Variety or Sketch Comedy Program or Series.

Winners and nominees

References

Ensemble Performance in a Comedy